The 2011 Tennessee Volunteers football team represented the University of Tennessee in the 2011 NCAA Division I FBS football season. The team was coached by Derek Dooley, who entered his second season with UT. The Volunteers played their home games at Neyland Stadium in Knoxville, Tennessee, and competed in the Eastern Division of the Southeastern Conference (SEC).

Recruiting class

Tennessee's recruiting class was highlighted by six players from the "ESPN 150": No. 57 DeAnthony Arnett (WR); No. 63 Curt Maggitt (OLB); No. 73 Marcus Jackson (OG); No. 105 Antonio Richardson (OT); No. 118 A.J. Johnson (ILB); and No. 134 Marlin Lane (RB). Tennessee signed the No. 13 recruiting class according to Rivals and the No. 11 recruiting class according to Scout. The football program received 27 letters of intent on National Signing Day, February 2, 2011.

Schedule

Schedule Source:

Personnel

Coaching staff

The Middle Tennessee game is notable for having Derrick Brodus, a redshirt freshman walk-on who was not on the depth chart and never played college football, plucked from his fraternity's couch after Tennessee's other kickers (regular Michael Palardy was out and his replacement Chip Rhome hurt himself during warm-ups) were unavailable. He got the call less than an hour before kickoff. Brodus scored three extra points and a field goal in the victory.

Team players drafted into the NFL

Reference:

References

Tennessee
Tennessee Volunteers football seasons
Tennessee Volunteers football